Thijman, or Tyman Oosdorp (20 November 1613 – 24 August 1668), was a Dutch Golden Age brewer and magistrate of Haarlem.

Biography
He was born in Amsterdam as the son of Franciscus Oosdorp, rector of the Latin School there and Maria Jansdr. On 12 July 1640 he married Hester Olycan in Haarlem, where he owned the brewery De Pauw. Hester was the daughter of the Haarlem brewer Pieter Jacobsz Olycan.

He died in Haarlem.

References

Tyman Oosdorp on KNAW

1613 births
1668 deaths
Frans Hals
Businesspeople from Haarlem